The Apalachicola Northern Railroad  was a short-line railroad which operated in the Florida Panhandle. It was founded in 1903 and ceased operating in 2002 when the St. Joe Company, its corporate parent, leased its line to the AN Railway.

History 
The company was chartered on April 7, 1903. Construction began on March 21, 1905, and trains began running north from Apalachicola in 1907. The extension to Port St. Joe was completed on May 10, 1910.

The company operated in receivership on three separate occasions: July 1907 to October 1908, May 1914 to February 1916 and May 1932 to December 1936.

The company came under ownership of Alfred I. du Pont in 1933, along with the entire town of Port St. Joe. The railroad's largest customer, the St. Joe Paper Company mill in Port St. Joe, was owned by the Alfred I. duPont Testamentary Trust from 1936 to 1996.  On September 30, 1940, Edward Ball, who managed the du Pont trust properties, transferred control of the railroad to the St. Joe Paper Company. When the paper company was sold in 1996, ownership of the railroad was returned to the St. Joe Company.

AN Railway, a subsidiary of the Rail Management Corporation leased line from the St. Joe Company on September 1, 2002 and acquired the railroad's locomotives, rolling stock, and railroad equipment. From that date the Apalachicola Northern ceased to operate as a railroad. The St. Joe Company continues to own the physical line.

References

Florida railroads
Railway companies established in 1903
Non-operating common carrier freight railroads in the United States
American companies established in 1903
1903 establishments in Florida
2002 disestablishments in Florida